Kiradech Aphibarnrat (born Anujit Hirunratanakorn, 23 July 1989) is a Thai professional golfer who plays on the Asian, European, and PGA Tours.

Amateur career
In both 2003 and 2004, Aphibarnrat won his age group at the Junior World Golf Championships. In 2007, he was on the gold medal team at the 2007 Summer Universiade and took a silver in the individual event at the 2007 Southeast Asian Games.

Professional career
Aphibarnrat turned professional in 2008 and began playing on the Asian Tour and the Japan Golf Tour in 2009. HIs first professional victory came in 2009 at the Mercedes-Benz Tour's Singha Pattaya Open, which he won by 11 strokes, earning US$50,000. Aphibarnrat's first Asian Tour win was at the 2011 SAIL Open.

Aphibarnrat's first victory on the European Tour was at the Maybank Malaysian Open in March 2013. The event was co-sanctioned by the Asian Tour, thus giving him a second win on that tour. In the event, which shortened to 54 holes due to thunderstorms, Aphibarnrat defeated Edoardo Molinari by one stroke.

He won his second European Tour title at the Shenzhen International in a sudden death playoff over Li Haotong. Having led the tournament at the 54 hole stage, he trailed late in the back nine, but eagled the 17th hole and then missed a birdie putt on the 18th for the outright victory. He would go on to birdie the first extra hole to claim victory. Aphibarnrat became only the second player from Thailand, after Thongchai Jaidee, to record multiple European Tour wins.

In 2018, Aphibarnrat gained membership status on the PGA Tour for the 2018–19 season. He became the first PGA Tour member from Thailand.

In September 2021, Aphibarnrat shot rounds of 64-68 to hold the 36-hole lead at the BMW PGA Championship. A third round 74 saw him fall out of contention. He responded with a final-round 64 on Sunday to eventually finish in a tie for second place, one shot behind Billy Horschel.

Aphibarnrat is sometimes referred to as "Asia's John Daly", a comparison of his "unathletic" physique to the similarly large body type of two-time major championship winner John Daly.

Amateur wins
2003 Junior World Golf Championships (Boys 13–14)
2004 Junior World Golf Championships (Boys 13–14)

Professional wins (12)

European Tour wins (4)

*Note: The 2013 Maybank Malaysian Open was shortened to 54 holes due to rain.
1Co-sanctioned by the Asian Tour
2Co-sanctioned by the PGA Tour of Australasia

European Tour playoff record (1–0)

Asian Tour wins (3)

*Note: The 2013 Maybank Malaysian Open was shortened to 54 holes due to rain.
1Co-sanctioned by the European Tour
2Co-sanctioned by the PGA Tour of Australasia

Asian Tour playoff record (0–1)

Asian Development Tour wins (3)

1Co-sanctioned by the All Thailand Golf Tour

All Thailand Golf Tour wins (6)

1Co-sanctioned by the ASEAN PGA Tour
2Co-sanctioned by the Asian Development Tour

Results in major championships

CUT = missed the half-way cut
WD = Withdrew
"T" = tied

Summary

Most consecutive cuts made – 4 (2016 PGA – 2018 Open)
Longest streak of top-10s – 0

Results in The Players Championship

CUT = missed the halfway cut
"T" indicates a tie for a place

Results in World Golf Championships
Results not in chronological order before 2015.

QF, R16, R32, R64 = Round in which player lost in match play
"T" = Tied

Team appearances
Amateur
Bonallack Trophy (representing Asia/Pacific): 2006
Southeast Asian Games (representing Thailand): 2007 (winners)

Professional
World Cup (representing Thailand): 2011, 2013, 2016, 2018
Royal Trophy (representing Asia): 2012 (winners), 2013
EurAsia Cup (representing Asia): 2014, 2016, 2018
Amata Friendship Cup (representing Thailand): 2018 (winners)

See also
2021 Korn Ferry Tour Finals graduates
2022 European Tour Qualifying School graduates

References

External links

Kiradech Aphibarnrat
Asian Tour golfers
Japan Golf Tour golfers
European Tour golfers
PGA Tour golfers
Kiradech Aphibarnrat
Golfers at the 2016 Summer Olympics
Golfers at the 2006 Asian Games
Kiradech Aphibarnrat
Southeast Asian Games medalists in golf
Kiradech Aphibarnrat
Kiradech Aphibarnrat
Competitors at the 2007 Southeast Asian Games
Universiade medalists in golf
Kiradech Aphibarnrat
Medalists at the 2007 Summer Universiade
Kiradech Aphibarnrat
1989 births
Living people